The Pirelli Calendar, known and trade-marked as "The Cal", is an annual trade calendar which has been published by the UK subsidiary of the Italian tyre manufacturing company Pirelli since 1964. The calendar has a reputation for its choice of photographers and models and featured glamour photography from the 1980s until the 2010s.

The calendar is produced with limited availability ( are printed annually). Copies do not go on sale, but are instead given as corporate gifts to celebrities and select Pirelli customers. The annual production cost was about US$2 million in 2017. Marco Tronchetti Provera, Pirelli's CEO since 1992, commented that the purpose of the Cal is "to mark the passing of time" by recording the zeitgeist.

History 
The Cal was originally created by the British art director Derek Forsyth. After an unpublished mockup in 1962, it became an annual publication from 1964. In some of the earlier calendars Pirelli tyres featured prominently, though this marketing aspect was later dropped. The first woman photographer to shoot the calendar was Sarah Moon in 1972. Publication was discontinued after the 1974 issue as an economizing cutback in response to the world recession resulting from the 1973 oil crisis. It was resurrected 10 years later and has been published regularly since then except for 2021.

For the first ten years of the calendar's existence it included photographs of fully clothed women, but an emphasis on nudity developed during the 1980s. The 1987 calendar, photographed by Terrence Donovan, was the first to feature only black models, included a bare-bottomed 16-year-old Naomi Campbell. The models were photographed topless in Savannah-like settings and styled in tribal fashion. The calendar continued to use mainly eroticised images until the mid-2010s, although in some instances the pictures taken by the photographers were considered by the editors to be too risqué to use.

From the mid-2010s the calendar moved away from eroticism, and around this time diversity began to be addressed. The 2008 calendar was photographed by Patrick Demarchelier in Shanghai and included a number of Asian models. At the same time a book, The Complete Works: The Pirelli Calendar 1964–2007, was published by Mondadori. The 2010 calendar, photographed by Terry Richardson, used similar imagery to that which was used in the calendar in the 1960s. In 2014 Pirelli released an unpublished calendar from 1986 shot by photographer Helmut Newton. A 50th anniversary book, Pirelli - The Calendar: 50 Years and More, was published by Taschen in 2015.

The 2016 calendar, photographed by Annie Leibovitz, aimed to celebrate women for their accomplishments rather than their physical attributes. It included Fran Lebowitz, Mellody Hobson, Serena Williams, Yoko Ono and Patti Smith to represent inspiring women of diverse ages in almost entirely clothed portraits. The 2017 calendar was photographed by Peter Lindbergh and the women in the photographs were fully dressed and wore no makeup. It was the first calendar in which the photographs had not been retouched. The women photographed included Helen Mirren, Nicole Kidman and Julianne Moore. For the 2018 calendar, photographer Tim Walker chose to feature only black models, including Duckie Thot, Adwoa Aboah, RuPaul, Whoopi Goldberg, and Thando Hopa.

The 2021 calendar was cancelled because of the global coronavirus pandemic but is returning for 2022, featuring musicians and titled On The Road.

Models 
Appearance in the calendar has become a mark of distinction for those photographic models who are chosen, as well as for the photographers commissioned to produce the images used. Between 1997 and 2015 casting director Jennifer Starr also influenced the look and direction of each calendar.  Over the years, the models and celebrities who have appeared in it include Alessandra Ambrosio, Bianca Balti, Ana Beatriz Barros, Malgosia Bela, Elsa Benítez, Mariacarla Boscono (3), Lauren Bush, Gisele Bündchen, Naomi Campbell (4), Gracie Carvalho, Helena Christensen, Cindy Crawford, Emanuela de Paula, Waris Dirie, Yamila Díaz, Lily Donaldson, Isabeli Fontana (8), Magdalena Frackowiak, Saskia de Brauw, Sonny Freeman Drane, Gigi Hadid, Duckie Thot, Bridget Hall, Filippa Hamilton, Miranda Kerr, Karlie Kloss, Heidi Klum, Karolína Kurková (3), Noémie Lenoir, Adriana Lima (3), Daisy Lowe, Angela Lindvall, Lakshmi Menon, Kate Moss (3), Petra Nemcová, Sasha Pivovarova, Natasha Poly, Frankie Rayder, Coco Rocha, RuPaul, Anja Rubik, Joan Smalls, Lara Stone (3), Fernanda Tavares, Caroline Trentini, Christy Turlington, Guinevere Van Seenus, Edita Vilkeviciute, Natalia Vodianova (5), Alek Wek (3), Daria Werbowy and Rosie Huntington-Whiteley.

Actresses: Patricia Arquette, Nadja Auermann, Monica Bellucci, Selma Blair, Laetitia Casta (3), Jessica Chastain, Yao Chen, Maggie Cheung, Aurélie Claudel, Lily Cole, Rachael Leigh Cook, Penélope Cruz, Lou Doillon, Julia Garner, Whoopi Goldberg, Shalom Harlow, Neith Hunter, Milla Jovovich, Nicole Kidman, James King, Nastassja Kinski, Abbey Lee Kershaw, Doutzen Kroes, Jennifer Lopez, Sophia Loren, Audrey Marnay, Sienna Rose Miller, Julianne Moore, Bridget Moynahan, Brittany Murphy, Carolyn Murphy, Lupita Nyong'o, Charlotte Rampling, Eva Riccobono, Amy Schumer, Elisa Sednaoui, Léa Seydoux, Jenny Shimizu, Amy Smart, Julia Stiles, Hilary Swank, Uma Thurman, Ai Tominaga, Naomi Watts, Kate Winslet, Robin Wright, and Zhang Ziyi.

Professional athlete: Serena Williams.

Dancer: Misty Copeland.

Singer: Patti Smith.

Photographers 
Peter Lindbergh produced three editions of the calendar and Annie Leibovitz two.

For Patrick Demarchelier, the Cal is "the most prestigious calendar in the world".

In the trend of Me Too movement and Weinstein effect, the Cal 2019 by Albert Watson features Laetitia Casta in lingerie without teasing nudity.

Filmography 
 The Pirelli Calendar Saga (2010) by Emmanuel Le Ber

Exhibitions 
 2016: during the New York Fashion Week Fall 2016, inside Skylight at Moynihan Station: photos by Hans Feurer, Inez and Vinoodh, Peter Lindbergh, Steve McCurry, Mert and Marcus, Herb Ritts, and Bruce Weber
 2018: 2017 Pirelli Calendar By Peter Lindbergh And More.., Multimedia Art Museum of Moscow, the Vasnetsov brothers art museum of Kirov, Kaliningrad museum of fine arts, Novosibirsk State Art Museum, Abakan picture gallery

Notes and references

Notes

References

Books

External links 
 

Advertising campaigns
Nude calendars
1964 establishments in the United Kingdom
Pirelli
Promotional calendars